Serap Özçelik Arapoğlu (born February 18, 1988) is a Turkish karateka, who competes in the kumite 50–53 kg divisions. She won a world title in 2014 and a European title in 2011, 2012 and 2014.

Özçelik took up karate in 2000 at Eyüp, Istanbul, and in 2005 was included to the national team. She is a member of EGO Sport Club in Ankara. Özçelik works as a teacher of physical education in Yaşar Doğu Primary School in Kağıthane, Istanbul.

At the 2013 World Games held in Cali, Colombia, she won the gold medal in the women's kumite 50 kg event. In the final she defeated Alexandra Recchia of France.

She represented Turkey at the 2020 Summer Olympics in Tokyo, Japan. She competed in the women's 55 kg event.

She lost her bronze medal match in the women's 50 kg event at the 2022 Mediterranean Games held in Oran, Algeria.

References

External links

Living people
Turkish female karateka
Turkish female martial artists
Kocaeli Büyükşehir Belediyesi Kağıt Spor athletes
1988 births
Sportspeople from Istanbul
Turkish schoolteachers
Competitors at the 2013 Mediterranean Games
Competitors at the 2018 Mediterranean Games
Mediterranean Games medalists in karate
Mediterranean Games gold medalists for Turkey
Mediterranean Games bronze medalists for Turkey
Competitors at the 2013 World Games
Competitors at the 2017 World Games
World Games medalists in karate
World Games gold medalists
World Games bronze medalists
Karateka at the 2015 European Games
Karateka at the 2019 European Games
European Games medalists in karate
European Games gold medalists for Turkey
European Games silver medalists for Turkey
Islamic Solidarity Games medalists in karate
Islamic Solidarity Games competitors for Turkey
Karateka at the 2020 Summer Olympics
Olympic karateka of Turkey
Competitors at the 2022 Mediterranean Games
21st-century Turkish sportswomen